John Lewis Petit (1736–1780) was an English physician and Fellow of the Royal Society.

Life
The son of John Petit of Little Aston, Staffordshire, he was born in the parish of Shenstone, Staffordshire. Admitted in 1752 to Queens' College, Cambridge, he graduated B.A. 1756, M.A. 1759, and M.D. 1766. He became Fellow of the Royal Society in 1759.

Petit was elected fellow of the College of Physicians in 1767, was Gulstonian lecturer in 1768, censor in that year, 1774, and 1777; and was elected physician to St. Bartholomew's Hospital on the death of Anthony Askew in 1774. He died on 27 May 1780.

Family
Petit married  Katherine Laetitia Serces in 1769. Their children included John Hayes Petit and Louis Hayes Petit.

Notes

Attribution

1736 births
1780 deaths
18th-century English medical doctors
Fellows of the Royal Society
People from Shenstone, Staffordshire
Alumni of Queens' College, Cambridge